Christina Hamill (born 31 January 2000) is a field hockey player from Ireland.

Career

Under–21
Christina Hamill made her debut for the Ireland U–21 team in 2019 during a four–nations tournament in Dublin. She went on to represent the team again at the EuroHockey Junior Championship in Valencia later that year.

In 2022, she was a member of the team at the FIH Junior World Cup in Potchefstroom.

National team
Following her successful career in the junior squad, Hamill was named in the national team for the 2022 FIH World Cup in Terrassa and Amsterdam.

References

External links

2000 births
Living people
Irish female field hockey players
Female field hockey defenders